A whirlwind is any kind of vertical wind vortex.

Whirlwind may also refer to:

Media and fiction

Film 
 The Whirlwind (serial film), a 1920 American film serial directed by Joseph A. Golden
 The Whirlwind (1933 film), an American Western 
 Whirlwind (1941 film), a Spanish film
 Whirlwind (1951 film), an American Western directed by John English starring Gene Autry
 Whirlwind (1953 film), an Iranian film
 Whirlwind (1964 film), a Japanese historical drama film
 Whirlwind (1988 film), a 1988 Soviet action film directed by Bako Sadykov

Music 
 Whirlwinds, a 1974 album by smooth jazz composer Deodato
 "Whirlwind", a song by the band Roxy Music on the 1975 album Siren
 "Whirlwind", a song by the band Broder Daniel
 Whirlwind (album), a 1980 album by singer/songwriter Andrew Gold
 The Whirlwind, a 2009 album by progressive rock band Transatlantic
 Whirlwind, rock band from Sri Lanka

Other 
 Marilyn Whirlwind, a fictional character in the television show Northern Exposure
 Whirlwind (comics), a Marvel Comics supervillain
 Whirlwind (novel), a 1986 novel by James Clavell
 "Whirlwind", an episode in the  documentary series The World at War
 Whip Whirlwind, a former identity of DC Comics character Max Mercury
 The Whirlwind, a satirical 19th century British weekly co-founded and edited by Herbert Vivian

Transport

Aviation 
 Two aircraft built by Westland Aircraft:
 Westland Whirlwind (fighter), a World War 2, twin-engined fighter plane
 Westland Whirlwind (helicopter), a helicopter
 Butterworth Westland Whirlwind, a replica of the Westland Whirlwind fighter
 Wright Whirlwind, a series of aircraft engines

Maritime 
 HMS Whirlwind, the name of two British Royal Navy destroyers
 USS Whirlwind, the name of two United States Navy patrol vessels
 Whirlwind (yacht), a J-class yacht involved in the America's Cup

Games 
 The Black Whirlwind, a Jade Empire character
 Jimmy White's 'Whirlwind' Snooker, a 1991 snooker computer game, named for the player Jimmy White, nicknamed The Whirlwind
 Whirlwind (pinball), a pinball machine made by Williams

Technology 
 Whirlwind I, a pioneering real-time computer
 Whirlwind mill, a pulverizing machine

Sports 
 Boston Whirlwinds, a former basketball team
 Cliff Wilson (1934–1994), former Welsh snooker player, nicknamed "The Whirlwind"
 Jimmy White (born 1962), famous English snooker player, nicknamed "The Whirlwind"
 Paterson Whirlwinds, the original name of the former basketball team the Paterson Crescents
 Wandsworth Whirlwinds, a rugby league club in London
 West Texas Whirlwinds, a basketball team
 Zhejiang Whirlwinds, a Chinese basketball club

Places 
 Whirlwind, West Virginia
 Whirlwind Inlet, an ice-filled inlet along the east coast of Graham Land
 Whirlwind Glaciers, four prominent converging glaciers which flow into the west side of Whirlwind Inlet
 Whirlwind Peak, a mountain in Canada

Other 
 Whirlwind USA, an American audio equipment manufacturer
 WhirlWind (Seabreeze), a roller coaster at Seabreeze Amusement Park in Rochester, New York
 Whirlwind, the former name of the roller coaster Bocaraca
 Operation Whirlwind, a failed Croatian Army offensive

See also 
 Tourbillon (disambiguation), French for whirlwind
 Reap the whirlwind (disambiguation)
 Wirbelwind, German for whirlwind, a World War 2 anti-aircraft vehicle